A list of species in genus Trisetum. There are approximately 75 species in this genus of grasses.

 Trisetum aeneum
 Trisetum agrostideum
 Trisetum agrostoides
 Trisetum airaeforme
 Trisetum airoides
 Trisetum alaskanum
 Trisetum albanicum
 Trisetum albidum
 Trisetum alopecuros
 Trisetum alpestre
 Trisetum alpinum
 Trisetum altaicum
 Trisetum altijugum
 Trisetum altum
 Trisetum ambiguum
 Trisetum americanum
 Trisetum andicola
 Trisetum andinum
 Trisetum andropogonoides
 Trisetum angustum
 Trisetum anomalum
 Trisetum antarcticum
 Trisetum antoniijosephii
 Trisetum araeanthum
 Trisetum arduanum
 Trisetum arenarium
 Trisetum argenteum
 Trisetum argentoideum
 Trisetum aristidoides
 Trisetum aureum
 Trisetum balearicum
 Trisetum bambusiforme
 Trisetum barbatipaleum
 Trisetum barbatum
 Trisetum barbinode
 Trisetum barcinonense
 Trisetum baregense
 Trisetum berteroanum
 Trisetum berteronianum
 Trisetum bertolonii
 Trisetum biaristatum
 Trisetum bifidum
 Trisetum biflorum
 Trisetum bongardii
 Trisetum bornmuelleri
 Trisetum brachyatherum
 Trisetum brandegei
 Trisetum brasiliense
 Trisetum brevifolium
 Trisetum brittonii
 Trisetum buchtienii
 Trisetum bulbosum
 Trisetum bungei
 Trisetum burnoufii
 Trisetum buschianum
 Trisetum californicum
 Trisetum canariense
 Trisetum canescens
 Trisetum carsicum
 Trisetum caudulatum
 Trisetum cavanillesianum
 Trisetum cavanillesii
 Trisetum cernuum
 Trisetum cheesemani
 Trisetum chiloense
 Trisetum chloranthum
 Trisetum chromostachyum
 Trisetum ciliare
 Trisetum clarkei
 Trisetum compressum
 Trisetum condensatum
 Trisetum confertum
 Trisetum congdoni
 Trisetum congdonii
 Trisetum conradiae
 Trisetum cristatum
 Trisetum cumingii
 Trisetum curvisetum
 Trisetum debile
 Trisetum depauperatum
 Trisetum deyeuxioides
 Trisetum dianthemum
 Trisetum disjunctum
 Trisetum distichophyllum
 Trisetum dozei
 Trisetum dregeanum
 Trisetum drucei
 Trisetum dufourei
 Trisetum durangense
 Trisetum elatum
 Trisetum elongatum
 Trisetum erectum
 Trisetum evolutum
 Trisetum faurei
 Trisetum fedtschenkoi
 Trisetum filifolium
 Trisetum flaccidum
 Trisetum flavescens
 Trisetum floribundum
 Trisetum foliosum
 Trisetum formosanum
 Trisetum forskelii
 Trisetum fournieranum
 Trisetum fraudulentum
 Trisetum friesianum
 Trisetum frondosum
 Trisetum fuegianum
 Trisetum fuscescens
 Trisetum gallecicum
 Trisetum gaudinianum
 Trisetum glabratum
 Trisetum glabrum
 Trisetum glaciale
 Trisetum glomeratum
 Trisetum glumaceum
 Trisetum gmelini
 Trisetum gracile
 Trisetum griseovirens
 Trisetum groenlandicum
 Trisetum hallii
 Trisetum handelii
 Trisetum henryi
 Trisetum heteronymum
 Trisetum hirsutum
 Trisetum hirtiflorum
 Trisetum hirtulum
 Trisetum hirtum
 Trisetum hispanicum
 Trisetum hispidum
 Trisetum hohenackeri
 Trisetum homochlamys
 Trisetum howellii
 Trisetum humile
 Trisetum imberbe
 Trisetum inaequale
 Trisetum insulare
 Trisetum interruptum
 Trisetum irazuense
 Trisetum juergensii
 Trisetum kitadakense
 Trisetum kochianum
 Trisetum koelerioides
 Trisetum koidzumianum
 Trisetum kurtzii
 Trisetum labradoricum
 Trisetum lachnanthum
 Trisetum laconicum
 Trisetum lasianthum
 Trisetum lasiolepis
 Trisetum lasiorhachis
 Trisetum latifolium
 Trisetum lautum
 Trisetum laxiflorum
 Trisetum laxum
 Trisetum lechleri
 Trisetum leoninum
 Trisetum lepidum
 Trisetum leve
 Trisetum ligulatum
 Trisetum lineare
 Trisetum litorale
 Trisetum litvinovii
 Trisetum litvinowii
 Trisetum lobatum
 Trisetum loeffingii
 Trisetum loeflingianum
 Trisetum longiaristum
 Trisetum longifolium
 Trisetum longiglume
 Trisetum ludovicianum
 Trisetum lusitanicum
 Trisetum luteum
 Trisetum luzonense
 Trisetum macbridei
 Trisetum macilentum
 Trisetum macranthum
 Trisetum macratherum
 Trisetum macrochaetum
 Trisetum macrotrichum
 Trisetum macrum
 Trisetum maidenii
 Trisetum majus
 Trisetum malacanthum
 Trisetum malacophyllum
 Trisetum martha-gonzaleziae
 Trisetum mattheii
 Trisetum melicoides
 Trisetum melitense
 Trisetum mexicanum
 Trisetum micans
 Trisetum michellii
 Trisetum micranthum
 Trisetum micratherum
 Trisetum miegevillii
 Trisetum minutiflorum
 Trisetum molle
 Trisetum mollifolium
 Trisetum mongolicum
 Trisetum montanum
 Trisetum monticola
 Trisetum morisii
 Trisetum muricatum
 Trisetum muticum
 Trisetum myrianthum
 Trisetum nancaguense
 Trisetum nanum
 Trisetum neesii
 Trisetum neglectum
 Trisetum nemorosum
 Trisetum nitidum
 Trisetum nivosum
 Trisetum noeanum
 Trisetum nudum
 Trisetum nutkaense
 Trisetum obtusiflorum
 Trisetum ochrostachyum
 Trisetum oreophilum
 Trisetum orthochaetum
 Trisetum ovatipaniculatum
 Trisetum ovatum
 Trisetum pallidum
 Trisetum palmeri
 Trisetum palustre
 Trisetum palustris
 Trisetum paniceum
 Trisetum paniculatum
 Trisetum pappophoroides
 Trisetum paradoxum
 Trisetum parviflorum
 Trisetum parvispiculatum
 Trisetum pauciflorum
 Trisetum paui
 Trisetum pennsylvanicum
 Trisetum pensylvanicum
 Trisetum persicum
 Trisetum phleoides
 Trisetum pilosum
 Trisetum pinetorum
 Trisetum pourreti
 Trisetum praecox
 Trisetum pratense
 Trisetum preslei
 Trisetum pringlei
 Trisetum projectum
 Trisetum puberulum
 Trisetum pubescens
 Trisetum pubiflorum
 Trisetum pumilum
 Trisetum pungens
 Trisetum purpurascens
 Trisetum pyramidatum
 Trisetum rechingeri
 Trisetum rigidum
 Trisetum rohlfsii
 Trisetum rosei
 Trisetum rufescens
 Trisetum ruprechtii
 Trisetum sandbergii
 Trisetum saxeticola
 Trisetum scabriflorum
 Trisetum scabriusculum
 Trisetum scabrivalve
 Trisetum scitulum
 Trisetum sclerophyllum
 Trisetum seravschanicum
 Trisetum sericeum
 Trisetum serpentinum
 Trisetum sesquiflorum
 Trisetum sesquiterium
 Trisetum sesquitertium
 Trisetum shearii
 Trisetum sibiricum
 Trisetum sikkimense
 Trisetum smyrnaeum
 Trisetum spellenbergii
 Trisetum spicatum
 Trisetum spiciforme
 Trisetum splendens
 Trisetum splendidulum
 Trisetum steudelii
 Trisetum striatum
 Trisetum subaristatum
 Trisetum subspicatum
 Trisetum subspontaneum
 Trisetum taquetii
 Trisetum tarnowskii
 Trisetum teberdense
 Trisetum tenellum
 Trisetum tenue
 Trisetum tenuiforme
 Trisetum thospiticum
 Trisetum thunbergii
 Trisetum tibeticum
 Trisetum toluccense
 Trisetum tomentosum
 Trisetum tonduzii
 Trisetum transcaucasicum
 Trisetum transsilvanicum
 Trisetum transylvanicum
 Trisetum triflorum
 Trisetum trinii
 Trisetum trisetaria
 Trisetum turcicum
 Trisetum umbratile
 Trisetum umbrosum
 Trisetum uniflorum
 Trisetum vaccarianum
 Trisetum valesiaca
 Trisetum valesiacum
 Trisetum variabile
 Trisetum varium
 Trisetum velutinum
 Trisetum viciosorum
 Trisetum vidali
 Trisetum villosum
 Trisetum virescens
 Trisetum viride
 Trisetum virletii
 Trisetum weberbaueri
 Trisetum wilhelmsii
 Trisetum wiliamsii
 Trisetum williamsii
 Trisetum wolfii
 Trisetum wrangelense
 Trisetum youngii
 Trisetum yunnanense

References

Trisetum
Trisetum